Sarab (also Romanized as Sarāb; also known as Sarāb-e Gīlān) is a village in Cheleh Rural District, in the Central District of Gilan-e Gharb County, Kermanshah Province, Iran. At the 2006 census, its population was 1,224, in 285 families.

References 

Populated places in Gilan-e Gharb County